Asopos (also Latinised as Asopus) is a village and a former municipality in Laconia, Peloponnese, Greece. Since the 2011 local government reform it is part of the municipality Monemvasia, of which it is a municipal unit. The municipal unit has an area of 94.360 km2. Population 3,840 (2011). The seat of the municipality was in Papadianika.

History

References

Populated places in Laconia